Clermont-Ferrand is a railway station, located on the Saint-Germain-des-Fossés–Nîmes railway in Clermont-Ferrand, Auvergne-Rhône-Alpes, France. The station is served by Intercités (Intercity) and TER (Regional) services operated by SNCF.

Location 
The station is located on the Saint-Germain-des-Fossés–Nîmes, Clermont-Ferrand-Saint-Just-sur-Loire and Eygurande-Merlines-Clermont-Ferrand railways.

History 

The station opened in 1855 following the extension of the line from Gannat. The station of Clermont-Ferrand has been renovated between 2010 and 2018.

Train services 
The following services call at Clermont-Ferrand as of 2022:
intercity services (Intercités) Paris - Nevers - Moulins - Vichy - Riom - Clermont-Ferrand 
intercity services (Intercités) Clermont-Ferrand - Millau - Béziers
local service (TER Auvergne-Rhône-Alpes) Nevers - Moulins - Saint-Germain-des-Fossés - Vichy - Clermont-Ferrand
local service (TER Auvergne-Rhône-Alpes) Volvic - Clermont-Ferrand
local service (TER Auvergne-Rhône-Alpes) Montluçon - Gannat - Clermont-Ferrand
local service (TER Auvergne-Rhône-Alpes) Clermont-Ferrand - Issoire - Neussargues - Aurillac
local service (TER Auvergne-Rhône-Alpes) Clermont-Ferrand - Issoire - Brioude - Le Puy-en-Velay
local service (TER Auvergne-Rhône-Alpes) Clermont-Ferrand - Thiers
local service (TER Auvergne-Rhône-Alpes) Clermont-Ferrand - Vichy - Roanne - Lyon
local service (TER Occitanie) Clermont-Ferrand - Brioude - Langeac - Génolhac - Alès - Nîmes

References

Railway stations in Auvergne-Rhône-Alpes
Railway stations in France opened in 1855
Transport in Clermont-Ferrand